Desirèe Henry (born 26 August 1995) is an English sprinter of Antiguan and Guyanese descent who competes in the 100 metres and 200 metres. She won an Olympic bronze medal in the 4 x 100 metres relay at the 2016 Rio Games, and a silver medal in the 4 × 100 m relay at the World Athletics Championships in London on 12 August 2017.

Childhood
Henry was born on 26 August 1995 in Edmonton, London. She attended Highfield Primary School and St Anne's Catholic High School.

Career
Henry is the 2011 World Youth Champion in the 200 meters. Her personal bests are 11.06 for the 100 meters, 22.46 for the 200 meters and sprinted 52.27 in the 400 meters all set in 2016.

Henry was one of seven young people who lit the Olympic cauldron at the London 2012 Olympic opening ceremony. All were nominated by famous British Olympians, with Henry being nominated by decathlete Daley Thompson.

Henry improved her personal bests in 2016 to 11.06 in the 100 meters and 22.46 in the 200 meters and earned selection for the Rio Olympics. She began sprinting over 400 meters in 2015 but soon returned to shorter distances. In Rio, she reached the semifinals of the 100 metres, running 11.09, having run 11.08 in her heat. She went on to win a bronze medal in the sprint relay, setting a new British record of 41.77, along with her teammates Asha Philip, Dina Asher-Smith and Daryll Neita.

International competitions

Note: Results in brackets indicate superior time achieved in qualifying rounds.

1Did not finish in the final

References

Living people
1995 births
Sportspeople from Blackpool
English female sprinters
European Athletics Championships medalists
World Athletics Championships athletes for Great Britain
Olympic cauldron lighters
English sportspeople of Antigua and Barbuda descent
English people of Guyanese descent
Sportspeople of Guyanese descent
Black British sportswomen
Athletes (track and field) at the 2016 Summer Olympics
Olympic athletes of Great Britain
Olympic bronze medallists for Great Britain
Medalists at the 2016 Summer Olympics
Olympic bronze medalists in athletics (track and field)
World Athletics Championships medalists
Olympic female sprinters